Branicki Palace may refer to:

Branicki Palace, Białystok
Branicki Palace, Warsaw